Adrian John Young (10 March 1943 – 12 August 2020) was an Australian rules footballer who played one game for the St Kilda Football Club in the Victorian Football League (VFL).

Notes

External links 

2020 deaths
1943 births
Australian rules footballers from Tasmania
St Kilda Football Club players
Burnie Football Club players